Aeroclube de Sergipe  is a private aerodrome located in Aracaju, Brazil.

Airlines and destinations
No scheduled flights operate at this airport.

Access

See also

List of airports in Brazil
 Aracaju-Santa Maria

References

External links

Airports in Sergipe